Petříkov is a municipality and village in Prague-East District in the Central Bohemian Region of the Czech Republic. It has about 600 inhabitants.

Administrative parts
The village of Radimovice is an administrative part of Petříkov.

References

Villages in Prague-East District